Tatopani may refer to several places in Nepal:

Tatopani, Jumla, Karnali
Tatopani (village), Jumla, Karnali
Tatopani, Myagdi
Tatopani, Sindhupalchok
Tatopani, Surkhet